The 2016–17 West Coast Conference men's basketball season began with practices on September 30, 2016 and ended with the 2017 West Coast Conference men's basketball tournament March 2–7, 2017. The regular season began on November 11, 2016, with the conference schedule starting December 29, 2016.  This was the 66th season for WCC men's basketball, and the 28th under its current name of "West Coast Conference". The conference was founded in 1952 as the California Basketball Association, became the West Coast Athletic Conference in 1956, and dropped the word "Athletic" in 1989.

On February 18, 2017, Gonzaga clinched a share of the regular season title with win over Pacific. The title was Gonzaga's 16th title in the prior 17 years. Gonzaga clinched the outright regular season conference title on February 24 by beating San Diego.

For the ninth consecutive year, the West Coast Conference tournament was held at the Orleans Arena in Paradise, Nevada from March 3 through March 7, 2017. Gonzaga, appearing in the conference final for the 20th consecutive year, defeated Saint Mary's to win the conference championship. As a result, they received the conference's automatic bid to the NCAA tournament.

Gonzaga's Nigel Williams-Goss was awarded Player of the Year and Newcomer of the Year by the conference. Gonzaga's Mark Few was named coach of the year for the 11th time.

Two WCC schools received bids to the NCAA tournament: Gonzaga and Saint Mary's. Gonzaga received the No. 1 seed in the West region. Gonzaga advanced to the National Championship for the first time in school history, losing to North Carolina. The conference's record in the Tournament was 6–2. BYU also received a postseason bid to the National Invitation Tournament while San Francisco received an invitation to the College Basketball Invitational tournament.

Head coaches

Coaching changes 
 On March 3, 2016, it was announced that Pacific head coach Ron Verlin was no longer employed by the university. Interim coach Mike Burns was also released from his employment with the school. On March 16, the school announced that Damon Stoudamire would be the new head coach.
 On March 7, 2016, head coach Kerry Keating was fired by Santa Clara. On March 29, the school hired Herb Sendek as head coach. 
 On March 9, 2016, San Francisco head coach Rex Walters was fired. On March 30, the school hired Kyle Smith as head coach.
 On March 15, 2016, Portland fired head coach Eric Reveno. He finished at Portland with a 10-year record of 140–178. On April 1, the school announced that Terry Porter had been hired as head coach.

Coaches

Notes:
 Year at school includes 2016–17 season.
 Overall and WCC records are from time at current school and are through the beginning of the 2016–17 season.

Preseason

Preseason poll 
Source

All-WCC Preseason Men's Basketball team

Source

Rankings

WCC regular season

Conference matrix
This table summarizes the head-to-head results between teams in conference play.

All-WCC awards and teams
On February 28, the conference announced conference awards.

Postseason

West Coast Conference tournament

NCAA tournament

The winner of the WCC tournament, Gonzaga, received the conference's automatic bid to the NCAA tournament. Saint Mary's received an at-large bid to the Tournament.

See also
2016–17 NCAA Division I men's basketball season
West Coast Conference men's basketball tournament
2016–17 West Coast Conference women's basketball season
West Coast Conference women's basketball tournament
2017 West Coast Conference women's basketball tournament

References